Bugogwa is an administrative ward in Ilemela District, Mwanza Region, Tanzania with a postcode number 33207. In 2016 the Tanzania National Bureau of Statistics report there were 32,925 people in the ward, from 37,312 in 2012.

Villages 
The ward has 15 villages.

 Igombe A
 Bugogwa
 Lugezi
 Kabangaja
 Kasamwa
 Igombe B
 Kigote
 Kilabela
 Bujimwa
 Kayenze Ndogo
 Kisundi
 Isanzu
 Igogwe
 Nkoroto
 Kilimanilwe Mtemi

References

Wards of Mwanza Region
Ilemela District
Constituencies of Tanzania